Tylenchoidea is a superfamily of roundworms. Its members are either plant parasites or detritivores.

References 

Tylenchida
Animal superfamilies